Konnagar railway station is located on the Howrah–Bardhaman main line, in Hooghly district, West Bengal, India. It serves Konnagar Town. It has 3 platforms and it was electrified in 1958.

References

Railway stations in Hooghly district
Kolkata Suburban Railway stations